Garbeeke is a small river of Lower Saxony, Germany. It flows into the Klosterbach (the upper course of the Varreler Bäke) near Bassum.

See also
List of rivers of Lower Saxony

Rivers of Lower Saxony
Rivers of Germany